Phaedinus schaufussi is a species of beetle in the family Cerambycidae. It was described by Nonfried in 1890.

References

Trachyderini
Beetles described in 1890